Wanda is an Austrian indie pop band founded in Vienna in 2012. 

Their debut album Amore was released in October 2014 at Problembär Records and debuted at number 13 on the Austrian Albums Chart on 31 October 2014. Their single "Bologna" (which features that Italian city) was released in early 2015 and peaked at number 42 on 10 April 2015. Wanda's first tour took place in late 2014, with a second tour in February 2015, with locations in Austria, Germany, and Switzerland (i.e. the German Sprachraum). On 2 October 2015 their second album Bussi was released. They made a deal with Universal Music Germany.

Their indie pop style is influenced by rock 'n' roll, as well as Austropop (Austrian singer-songwriters). 
They label their music as "pop music with 'Amore'". Their songs are sung in German, with a more or less strongly noticeable Viennese dialect.

In August of 2020 drummer Lukas Hasitschka left the band. 

Keyboarder Christian Hummer died in September 26, 2022, after long and severe illness.

Discography

Albums
Studio

Live

Singles

Other charted songs

References

External links
Official website

Musical groups established in 2012
2012 establishments in Austria